Barharia is a Community development block and a town in the northern part of the Siwan District in the Indian state of Bihar. It is one out of 13 blocks located in Siwan Subdivision. Barharia is surrounded by Manjha Block to the North, Siwan Block to the South, Goriakothi Block to the East, and Thawe Block towards North. Mirganj, Siwan, Barauli, and Gopalganj are nearby cities.

Barharia town is the headquarter of this block.

It was in the national news in 2001 when part of the block was flooded by  the Daha River.

Demographics of Barharia
According to the 2011 Census of India the total population of Barharia block is 321,292. Out of which 164,179 are males and 157,113 are females. 68.93% people are literate. 67.14% people are Hindu and 32.57% people are Muslim in the block.

Gram panchayats 
Barharia block is divided into 30 Gram Panchayats.

See also
List of districts of Bihar
Barharia (Vidhan Sabha constituency)
Siwan district
Siwan, Bihar

References

External links
Bihar Atlas

Community development blocks in Siwan district